Ried im Zillertal is a municipality in the Schwaz district in the Austrian state of Tyrol.

Geography
Ried lies in the central Ziller valley on the left bank of the Ziller.

References

Cities and towns in Schwaz District